Meyami County is in Semnan province, Iran. The capital of the county is the city of Meyami. At the 2006 census, the region's population (as Meyami District of Shahrud County) was 36,824 in 9,583 households. It was separated from Shahrud County in September 2011. The following census in 2011 counted 37,258 people in 11,100 households. At the 2016 census, the county's population was 38,718 in 12,481 households, by which time the district had been separated from the county to become Meyami County.

Administrative divisions

The population history and structural changes of Meyami County's administrative divisions over three consecutive censuses are shown in the following table. The latest census shows two districts, five rural districts, and one city.

References

 

Counties of Semnan Province